Ctenopelta porifera is a species of sea snail, a marine gastropod mollusk in the family Peltospiridae.

Description
The length of the shell attains 10.6 mm.

Distribution
It is a pioneer species at hydrothermal vents in East Pacific Rise.

References

 Warén A. & Bouchet P. (1993) New records, species, genera, and a new family of gastropods from hydrothermal vents and hydrocarbon seeps. Zoologica Scripta 22: 1-90

External links
 Warén A. & Bouchet P. (2001). Gastropoda and Monoplacophora from hydrothermal vents and seeps new taxa and records. The Veliger, 44(2): 116-231

Peltospiridae
Gastropods described in 1993